A wasp is a type of flying insect.

Wasp may also refer to:

Art, entertainment, and media

Fictional entities
Several Marvel characters, including:
Wasp (character), introduced in 1963
Hope van Dyne, the Marvel Cinematic Universe character
Nadia van Dyne, who was introduced in 2016
Lisbeth Salander, a character in the Millennium series nicknamed Wasp
Waspinator or Wasp, several Transformers characters
World Aquanaut Security Patrol, an organization in the television series Stingray

Films
Wasp (2003 film), a film by Andrea Arnold
Wasp (2015 film), a British-French film
The Wasp (1915 film), a short by B. Reeves Eason
The Wasp (1918 film), a lost silent film comedy drama

Literature
Wasp (novel), a novel by Eric Frank Russell
The Wasps, a comic play by Aristophanes

Music
W.A.S.P. (band), an American rock/metal band
W.A.S.P. (album), their 1984 self-titled album
"Wasp", a song by Black Sabbath from the album Black Sabbath
Wasp (album), a 1980 album by Shaun Cassidy
"W.A.S.P.", a song from the Dayglo Abortions album, Two Dogs Fucking
The Wasps (Vaughan Williams), a 1909 suite for orchestra composed by Ralph Vaughan Williams
"The WASP (Texas Radio and the Big Beat)", a song by The Doors from the album L.A. Woman
EDP Wasp, a monophonic synthesizer by Electronic Dream Plant

Periodicals
The Wasp (magazine), a 19th-century San Francisco magazine
The Wasp (newspaper), a 19th-century newspaper published in Nauvoo, Illinois

Radio
WASP-LP, a low-power radio station (104.5 FM) licensed to serve Huntington, West Virginia, United States
WASP (AM), a defunct radio station (1130 AM) formerly licensed to serve Brownsville, Pennsylvania, United States

Science and technology

Information technology
Web Standards Project
WAsP, Wind Atlas Analysis and Application Program
Wireless application service provider

Weapons
AGM-124 Wasp, an American experimental air-to-ground anti-tank missile
Wasp 58, a recoilless rocket launcher

Other uses in science and technology
Wiskott–Aldrich syndrome protein
Wide Angle Search for Planets (WASP), a British group searching for extra-solar planets

Sport

Wasps FC, an amateur English rugby union club
Wasps Ladies, an English women's rugby union club
Wasps RFC, a professional English rugby union club based in the Coventry area (known from 1999 to 2014 as London Wasps)
York Wasps, former English rugby league club
Chalfont Wasps F.C., English football club
Durham Wasps, former British ice–hockey team
Newport Wasps, British speedway team
Emory and Henry Wasps, NCAA Division III intercollegiate sport team
WASP (cricket calculation tool), an algorithm used in limited overs cricket matches to predict the outcome of games

Transportation

Aviation
ABC Wasp, a British World War I aero engine by ABC Motors
AeroVironment Wasp III, unmanned aerial vehicle (UAV) developed for United States Air Force special forces
Airspeed Queen Wasp, British unmanned target-aircraft
Curtiss 18 Wasp, a little-used American triplane fighter of World War I
Pratt & Whitney Wasp series, a series of piston engines common in the 1930s and 1940s
Westland Wasp, a British-built light shipborne helicopter
Women Airforce Service Pilots, World War II American female aviators
Williams Aerial Systems Platform, from Williams International
Wasp Flight Systems, a British powered hang glider manufacturer
Wasp SP Mk2, a British powered hang glider design

Land
Hudson Wasp, 1950s, American automobile
Martin Wasp, 1910s and 20s, American automobile
Wasp Motorcycles, British motorcycle and sidecar manufacturer
Wasp, a variant of the Universal Carrier armored vehicle that was armed with a flamethrower

Ships
, several ships of the Royal Navy
, several ships of the United States Navy
, ships of the United States Navy
Wasp (1809 ship), a ship that made a whaling voyage in the 1820s
Wasp (1776 ship), British slaving vessel

Other uses
White Anglo-Saxon Protestants (WASPs), an upper class elite in the United States 
Wasp, Pleasants County, West Virginia, a community in the United States
Workers and Socialist Party, a South African political party

See also
Wasp waist, a silhouette given by a style of corset
WWASP, World Wide Association of Specialty Programs